Mgama is an administrative ward in the Iringa Rural district of the Iringa Region of Tanzania. In 2016 the Tanzania National Bureau of Statistics report there were 13,143 people in the ward, from 12,561 in 2012.

Villages / vitongoji 
The ward has 5 villages and 44 vitongoji.

 Ibumila
 Gezaulole
 Ibumila A
 Ibumila B
 Kilewela
 Kilimanjaro
 Kipengele
 Lugololelo B
 Lwato
 Lwato A
 Lwato B
 Makete A
 Makete B
 Mlenge A
 Mlenge B
 Ilandutwa
 Lugofu
 Lugololelo A
 Mayugi
 Ndolela
 Nyakatule A
 nyakatule B
 Mgama
 Isombe
 Katenge ‘A’
 Katenge ‘B’
 Kihesa
 Mbalamo
 Mgama ‘A’
 Mgama ‘B’
 Mhagati
 Msichoke
 Myombwe
 Wangama
 Wilolesi
 Itwaga
 Ikanavanu
 Ilyango ‘A’
 Ilyango ‘B’
 Itwaga
 Nunumala
 Ihemi
 Igunga
 Ihemi A
 Kifumbi
 Kilimahewa
 Kilimanjaro
 Mfaranyaki
 Mjimwema
 Njiapanda
 Winome

References 

Wards of Iringa Region